Gilles Kohler is a French actor, born November 18, 1948

Former Model, Gilles Kohler started out in 1974 as the blonde angel Jean in Marcel Carné's La Merveilleuse visite. Two years later he plays Jean-Pierre, a lover between two women (Claude Jade in a dual role), in The Choice (1976). In the same year he is leading man alongside to Paola Tedesco in Amore grande, amore libero. David Hamilton commits the beautiful and handsome actor for the part of Pierre in Bilitis (1977) and he plays in other erotic films like in Just Jaeckin's Le Dernier Amant romantique. He is Jean-Paul Belmondos driver in Animal and Bernard Toublanc-Michel hired him for The Mutant. Since the 1980s, Gilles Kohler plays in American soap operas (General Hospital , Hart to Hart, Dallas, All My Children) and small parts in some American movies (Lethal Weapon with Mel Gibson).

Filmography
1963: General Hospital (TV Series, guest-star) - Phillipe (1982)
1974: La Merveilleuse visite (by Marcel Carné) - Jean
1976: The Choice (by Jacques Faber) - Jean-Pierre Arnaud
1976: Amore grande, amore libero (by Luigi Perelli) - Paolo
1976: L'inconveniente - Kidnapping Rosso Sangue (by Pupo de Luca)
1977: Bilitis (by David Hamilton) - Pierre
1977: Animal (by Claude Zidi) - Bruno's Driver
1977: Le mille-pattes fait des claquettes (by Jean Girault)
1978: Le Dernier Amant romantique (by Just Jaeckin) - Scorpion
1978: Le Mutant (TV Mini-Series, by Bernard Toublanc-Michel) - Briand
1979: Moonraker - Space Fighter (uncredited)
1980: Sibylle (Short, by Robert Cappadoro) - the photographer
1983: Hart to Hart (TV Series) - Pierre Dupont
1983-1984: Dallas (guest star in Odd Man Out, Hell Hath No Fury)
1985: All My Children (TV Series) - Gilles St. Claire
1987: Lethal Weapon (by Richard Donner) - Mercenary #6

References

External links

Gilles Kohler in NYT
Gilles Kohler at Unifrance Films

1948 births
20th-century French male actors
French male models
Living people